ENN Group is a Chinese energy company and one of China's largest private companies. 

Founded by Wang Yusuo in 1993, ENN started in natural gas, and has expanded into solar energy, energy chemicals and real estate.

References

External links

Natural gas companies of China